Expeditie Robinson 2012 was the fourteenth season of the RTL5 and 2BE reality television series Expeditie Robinson first aired on August 30, 2012. It was the seventh season hosted by Evi Hanssen and the first season hosted by Dennis Weening, contestant of Expeditie Robinson 2010.

Survivors

 Kamp Noord
 Kamp Zuid 
 Mangrove
 Samensmelting (Kador)
 Winnaarseiland

 Originally, Gene received one vote at the ninth council and four votes at the fourteenth council, but undid two votes by two immunity coins.

 Originally, Paul had two black votes at the ninth council, but undid one vote by one immunity coin.

 Originally, Tess received four votes at the third council, but undid two votes by two immunity coin.

 Originally, Zoë received four votes at the first council, but undid one vote by one immunity coin.

External links
 Official website Expeditie Robinson at RTL5
 Official website Expeditie Robinson at 2BE
 

Dutch reality television series
Expeditie Robinson seasons
2012 Dutch television seasons
2012 Belgian television seasons